Rosa Ángela Tenorio Silva (born 2 October 1984) is an Ecuadorian weightlifter. She competed at the 2012 Summer Olympics in the -69 kg event and finished 11th.

References 

1984 births
Living people
Olympic weightlifters of Ecuador
Weightlifters at the 2012 Summer Olympics
Ecuadorian female weightlifters
21st-century Ecuadorian women
20th-century Ecuadorian women